Mocis diplocyma is a moth of the family Erebidae. It is found in South America, including Brazil and French Guiana.

References

External links
Image

diplocyma
Moths of South America
Lepidoptera of Brazil
Moths described in 1913